Vaseno is a small settlement in the Tuhinj Valley in the Upper Carniola region of Slovenia.

References

External links

Vaseno on Geopedia

Populated places in the Municipality of Kamnik